Zhao Yinghui (born October 20, 1981 in Shijiazhuang, Hebei) is a Chinese sport shooter who competed in 10 metre air rifle at the 2000 Summer Olympics, the 2004 Summer Olympics, and the 2008 Summer Olympics. She reached the 2004 final and finished fourth.

Olympic results

Records

External links
 profile

1981 births
Living people
ISSF rifle shooters
Chinese female sport shooters
Olympic shooters of China
Sportspeople from Shijiazhuang
Shooters at the 2000 Summer Olympics
Shooters at the 2004 Summer Olympics
Shooters at the 2008 Summer Olympics
World record holders in shooting
Asian Games medalists in shooting
Sport shooters from Hebei
Shooters at the 1998 Asian Games
Shooters at the 2002 Asian Games
Shooters at the 2006 Asian Games
Asian Games gold medalists for China
Asian Games silver medalists for China
Asian Games bronze medalists for China
Medalists at the 1998 Asian Games
Medalists at the 2002 Asian Games
Medalists at the 2006 Asian Games